{{DISPLAYTITLE:Tau8 Eridani}}

Tau8 Eridani, Latinized from τ8 Eridani, is a binary star system in the constellation Eridanus. It is visible to the naked eye with a combined apparent visual magnitude of 4.65. The distance to this system can be estimated via the parallax method, yielding a value of around 380 light years.

This is a single-lined spectroscopic binary star system with an orbital period of about 459 days and an eccentricity of 0.18. The primary component is a B-type main sequence star with a stellar classification of B6 V. It is a slowly pulsating B-type star that undergoes radial-velocity variation with a frequency of 1.1569 times per day. The star has about five times the mass of the Sun and shines with 256 times the Sun's luminosity.

References

B-type main-sequence stars
Slowly pulsating B stars
Eridanus (constellation)
Eridani, Tau8
Eridani, 33
024587
018216
1181
Spectroscopic binaries
Durchmusterung objects